Harlingen Field (also known as Harlingen Municipal Stadium, Lon Hill Ballpark, or Giants Field) is a baseball park in Harlingen, Texas, that has been home to professional baseball, such as the Rio Grande Valley WhiteWings and the Harlingen Giants, and high school baseball. It has undergone numerous expansions and renovations throughout its fifty-year history, most notably in the early 2000s.

Sources
 "Ghost Leagues: Minor League Baseball in South Texas," Noe Torres, c.2005

References

Minor league baseball venues
Harlingen, Texas
Baseball venues in Texas
Buildings and structures in Cameron County, Texas
Florida Complex League ballparks
High school baseball venues in the United States